The Botswana Football Association (BFA) is the governing body of association football in Botswana, and controls the national football team. It is an affiliate of FIFA, CAF and the COSAFA.

National football leagues include the Botswana Premier League, Botswana First Division North and Botswana First Division South.

History 
In 1966, the Botswana National Football Association (BNFA) was created, before the name was changed in 1970 and the BFA officially founded. It was first affiliated to the CAF in 1976, and then with FIFA in 1978.

References

External links
Botswana Football Association
Botswana at the FIFA website

Botswana
Football in Botswana
Football
Sports organizations established in 1970